Searsia longipes is a medium-sized, semi-deciduous, trifoliate  tree of up to 10 m tall. It occurs in Africa from Burkina Faso to South Africa, as well as the islands of the Indian Ocean.

In Zimbabwe it is found at altitudes between 1000 and 1680 m - in other places this species can also be found at sea level.

Hostplant: The gracillaridae lepidoptera Caloptilia xanthochiria Vári, 1961  feed on this plant.

References

External links

African Plant Database

longipes